Johann Baptiste Nikolaus Ertl (b. 30 January 1909 - d. 17 July 1978) was an Austrian ice hockey player who competed in the 1928 Winter Olympics.

In 1928 he participated with the Austrian ice hockey team in the Olympic tournament.

External links
Olympic ice hockey tournament 1928 
Hans Ertl's profile at Sports Reference.com

1909 births
1978 deaths
Austrian ice hockey left wingers
Ice hockey people from Vienna
Ice hockey players at the 1928 Winter Olympics
Olympic ice hockey players of Austria